

History

The original Gippsland Football League was formed when the Northern Gippsland Football Association (NGFA) officially changed their name to “The Gippsland Football League” in 1921, which then operated under this title until 1953.

A new Gippsland football competition was formed in 1954, as the La Trobe Valley Football League,   when seven club's from the Central Gippsland Football League joined the Latrobe Valley Football League, with the three remaining Central Gippsland Football League club's joining the South Gippsland Football League.

Football Premierships

The following is a list of all the Gippsland FL premiership winning teams from 1921 to 1953 and of the La Trobe FL from 1954 to present day. 

The Reserves competition commenced in 1954, the Thirds competition in 1957 and the Fourths in 2000.

Notes
1921 - Maffra were undefeated premiers

Links
1931 - Gippsland FL: Maffra & Traralgon team photos
1931 - Gippsland FL Premiers: Sale FC team photo
1934 - Gippsland FL Premiers: Sale FC team photo
1936 - Gippsland FL Premiers: Yarram FC team photo
1937 - Gippsland FL Grand Final team photos
1949 - Gippsland FL Grand Final team photos
1952 - Gippsland FL Premiers: Bairnsdale FC team photo

Sources 

Australian rules football records and statistics
Gippsland Football League premiers
Gippsland Football League